is the 15th major single (18th overall) released by the Japanese band SCANDAL. The single was released in three editions: two limited CD+DVD editions and a regular CD only edition. Limited editions also includes a sticker illustrated by Aono Shunju. The title track was used as the theme song to the movie Ore wa Mada Honki Dashitenai Dake. This is the band's second best selling single with 40,361 copies, only surpassed their July 2014 single Yoake no Ryuuseigun.

Track listing 

2013 singles
Scandal (Japanese band) songs
Japanese film songs
2013 songs